Robin J. Robinson (born September 12, 1956) is an American politician and accountant serving as a member of the Mississippi House of Representatives from the 88th district. She assumed office on August 10, 2020.

Early life and education 
Born in Laurel, Mississippi, Robinson attended Northeast Jones High School. She earned an Associate of Arts degree from Jones County Junior College and a Bachelor of Science in business administration from the University of Southern Mississippi.

Career 
Robinson worked in various roles at Sanderson Farms for 40 years. During her tenure, she worked as cost accountant, chief accountant, chief internal auditor, manager of human resources, manager of organization development, and member of the executive board. She was elected to a member of the Mississippi House of Representatives in an August 2020 special election.

References 

Living people
People from Laurel, Mississippi
Republican Party members of the Mississippi House of Representatives
Women state legislators in Mississippi
Jones County Junior College alumni
University of Southern Mississippi alumni
1956 births